Piet van Wyk de Vries is an independent South African songwriter born in Pretoria in 1972.

Background
Piet van Wyk de Vries was born in Pretoria, South Africa on 7 May 1972. He grew up in Johannesburg and Pretoria. He attended School in Meyerspark and Silverton. He did his national service in the South African Police as a member of Eenheid 19 (Unit 19), from 1991 to 1994. He has done some freelance work in the security sector after that. He was also Director of Security at Wierda Glen Estate during 2010/11. While his main occupation has been as a songwriter for other artists, he has from time to time recorded some of his own material. He is also a Security Industry Specialist, and a Qualified Gunsmith. He currently specializes in Ceramic Coatings on firearms.

Early career
He started in the music industry by fronting the bands "Backyard Blues Band", "Superfly" and "Flying Circus", but soon changed directions by focusing more on music production and studio design. This culminated in 2000 when he designed and built what was at the time the largest digital studio in Africa for Sting Music in Johannesburg. This studio was the model for many subsequent digital studios in Southern Africa, including those of the South African Broadcast Corporation, and many production houses. He used this Pro Tools based studio to produce the first Afrikaans album by the artist Dozi (Hendrik Opperman), entitled "Op Aanvraag", which has since become one of the most successful albums of that genre of all time. This album also launched the career of songwriter Stef Kruger.

Before the Dozi album he arranged, wrote and produced music and live items for many South African artists in the English and Black markets, including PJ Powers, Lebo Mathosa and Billy Forrest. He also co-engineered a private recording for Eddy Grant, who recorded a birthday song in South Africa for his wife.

The band "Flying Circus" recorded two albums. The first was entitled "Favorite Jinx" and contained the radio hits "Just Like James Dean" and "Stay". The latter's music video going on to win awards for the production house, Rapid Blue.

Afrikaans writer
After that van Wyk de Vries switched his focus to the Afrikaans market, where he has produced mostly compilation albums, examples being some of the "Sokkietreffer" and "Bokjol" franchise compilations. He is much better known as a songwriter, and has written for a number of Afrikaans singers. Most notable of these are Dozi, Wynand Strydom and Mathys Roets, the last of which uses his songs almost exclusively.

In 2006, van Wyk de Vries returned to original production when he co-produced the album "Kom 'n Bietjie Binne" for Dozi, following the artist's move to Sony/BMG. This also contained the hit song "Susanna Soen My", which he wrote, produced and sang on.

Solo work
In 2007 he more or less retired from production work, and released a solo album, entitled "Die son die maan die sterre" (The sun the moon the stars), containing 11 original works, including the radio hits "MadeleinMadelein", "Iemand soos jy" and "Leë Skoene".

In September 2008 he released his second solo album, called "'n Pyl deur seil met vuur" (An arrow through sail with fire), and surprised attendants at a concert with a collaboration on stage with singer/songwriter Andre G. Nel. He has also in 2009/10 collaborated with the Coleske brothers on songs for the singer Guillome and others. In 2011 the artist Ricus Nel recorded the song "MadeleinMadelein" for his own solo album.

In 2010, he released a limited run CD entitled "Vensterkat maak 'n Wens" (Window-Cat makes a wish), at a show in the Pierneef Theatre. This was mostly attended by close friends and family, and by invitation only. The album contained many deeply personal songs, as well as some experimental and semi-instrumental compositions.

In 2012 He released his 4th solo album, entitled "Die Geheime Wereld van Piet van Wyk de Vries" at a sold out concert at Atterbury Theater in Pretoria. This album contained remixed and remastered versions of his favorite tracks from the previous albums, as well as a few new compositions.

During 2011 he focused on composing new material for a release by the singer Mathys Roets, entitled "Rembrand se Meisie in die Maan".

In 2012, van Wyk de Vries signed a deal with South African company Storm Records to produce and distribute an album encompassing the best works from the previous 3 studio albums. This album, entitled "Die geheime wêreld van Piet van Wyk de Vries" (The secret world of Piet van Wyk de Vries)was launched to much critical acclaim in May 2012 at the Atterbury Theatre in Pretoria.

EMI Music Publishing (South Africa)
EMI music Pub (SA) has handled van Wyk de Vries' music publishing, and administered his "Triplane Music" publishing label, since 1997. In 1997, van Wyk de Vries was offered one of the largest non-recoupable advances ever for a South African songwriter, as an incentive for signing with EMI Publishing. During the following years, EMI has in one way or another handled all publishing for all songs that van Wyk de Vries wrote, with the (one known) exception of a song called "This Life", which was penned by van Wyk de Vries and sung by the superstar PJ Powers, and was published by Sting Music. In 2011, after EMI Publishing had been bought by Sony/BMG, the company renewed its contracts with van Wyk de Vries for at least another five years.

Exhibitions
In 2008 the South African painter Bess Rheeders discovered van Wyk de Vries, and painted a series of paintings inspired by the songs on his first album. These were only displayed to the public once, and have all been sold into private collections since, apart from one painting, which she gave to the artist. In 2014, the Centurion Arts Association also presented an exhibition of works inspired by the lyrics of Piet van Wyk de Vries, as sung by Mathys Roets.

Digital Work

In 2001 the acclaimed and award winning simulation game, IL2, was released by Madox Games from Russia. Later that decade, van Wyk de Vries conducted some research to help improve subsequent versions of this game. He did this by creating photographic records of the WW2 era planes currently in the inventory of the Johannesburg based South African Museum of Military History. This in turn led him to the expanded and detailed re-researching and recompiling of the restoration files for some of the German Planes in the collection. In 2008 he became involved in the unauthorized modification of the game along with several white hat hackers, 3D artists and military history enthusiasts. Later that year he started an online platform, sas1946.com, for use in collaboration and project management. This website subsequently became the most successful of its genre in history, and gave rise to the release of several packs of mods like "Dark Blue World" and "BAT". The former being mentioned by PC Gamer magazine as in their list of top ten battlefield simulation games of all time.

Gunsmith
Building on along standing interest in firearms and fine arts, he began experimenting  in 2013 with various types of finishes for rifle stocks. This escalated quickly and by 2016 he had started cerakote.co.za, also known as Cerakote South Africa, which became the most successful ceramic firearm refinishing shop in South Africa. By 2018 he had completed various apprenticeships, and qualified as a licensed gunsmith. Cerakote SA has formed a close partnership with Shooting Stuff, a South African Firearms Shop in Centurion, and these businesses continue to be based and growing together.

He currently lives with his wife in Centurion, South Africa.

References

 Dozi "Op Aanvraag" CD SMMPCD895
 Dozi "Kom 'm Bietjie Binne" CDVAT6177
 Select Music South Africa Product Listings 2004–2006
 

https://pietvanwykdevries.bandcamp.com/
https://www.cerakote.com/find-applicator
https://www.cerakote.co.za/index.html
https://www.sas1946.com/main/

Further reading

1972 births
Living people
Afrikaner people
South African people of Dutch descent
Afrikaans-language singers
Afrikaans-language writers
21st-century South African male singers
South African record producers
South African songwriters
People from Pretoria